{{Infobox presenter
| image       =
| name        = Dominik Diamond
| caption     =
| birth_name   = Paul Dominik Diamond
| birth_date  = 
| birth_place = Arbroath, Scotland
| show        = The Rock of the Atlantic
| station     = Q104 Halifax
| timeslot    = 7pm-Midnight Mon-Fri
| show2       =
| station2    =
| timeslot2   =
| style       = Disc jockeyComedian
| country     = Canada
| prevshow    = The Dominik Diamond ShowQ107 TorontoDiamond and de AndradeTalk 1071400–1800 Mon-Fri"The Dominik Diamond Breakfast Show"XFM Scotland6:00–10:00 a.m. Monday–Friday"The Dominik Diamond Show"Beat 1061000–1300 Saturday/Sunday"Dominik & Dye" 5:30–9:30 am Monday–Friday102.1 The EdgeJack FM Calgary Morning Show
}}

Paul Dominik Diamond (born 31 December 1969) is a Scottish television and radio presenter and newspaper columnist. He is best known as the original presenter of Channel 4's video gaming programme GamesMaster, as host of The Dominik Diamond Breakfast Show on XFM Scotland and as a columnist for the Daily Star. After moving to Canada in 2009, he has hosted radio shows for stations in Toronto, Halifax and Calgary, where he was host of the Morning Show on Jack FM from 2015 to 2018.

Early life
Born in Arbroath, Scotland, Diamond attended Strathallan School in Forgandenny, Perthshire.

He then went on to study drama at Bristol University, where he was a contemporary of David Walliams and Simon Pegg. Diamond, Walliams and Pegg were part of a comedy troupe called "David Icke and The Orphans of Jesus". Walliams and Diamond fell out after Walliams appeared as a guest on Diamond and his friend (and GamesMaster commentator) Kirk Ewing's Paramount show "Dom'n'Kirk's Night O Plenty" - after which Diamond said that Walliams and co-Little Britain star Matt Lucas were "complete arseholes" on the show. In a 2007 interview Diamond said that he had not spoken to Walliams since, whom he described as both a "comic genius" and a "twat."

Television and publications
Diamond's biggest role on television came presenting 6 series of Channel 4's computer and video game show GamesMaster, which ran from 1992 to 1998. Diamond did not present the show's third series, following disagreements with the show's creators about Diamond's desire to pursue business opportunities outside GamesMaster and the appointment of McDonald's as the show's sponsor. He went on to present the short-lived BBC Scotland panel show Caledonia McBrains in 2002.

In 2006, Diamond filmed a Five documentary, Crucify Me. During filming, he took part in the annual Holy Week re-enactment of the crucifixion at San Pedro Cutud in the Philippines. However, he backed down at the last minute, breaking into tears.

He also has appeared on the Discovery Real Time programme, Rubble Trouble, which charts the development of his house extension. While residing in Brighton from 2002 to 2004, he trained and worked as a bus driver with the local transport company Brighton and Hove Bus Company, recording his thoughts and feelings for a documentary to be shown on UK television Channel 5. Similarly to Diamond, many celebrities have worked for Brighton and Hove Bus Company, some of which are named on the front of the city's buses.

Diamond's autobiography, Celtic & Me: Confessions From The Jungle, was published in the UK by Black & White Publishing in August 2010. The book is a combination of media memoir and the story of Diamond's life as a fan of Celtic Football Club. In 2015, he became one of 44 financial backers for the short film Autumn Never Dies.

Radio
Diamond launched XFM Scotland with The Dominik Diamond Breakfast Show on XFM Scotland in January 2006. On 27 June 2007, RadioToday.co.uk announced that Diamond had joined Talk 107 to cover a number of programmes over the summer months. From 13 October 2007 Diamond presented the Dominik Diamond Breakfast Club on Talk 107. In January 2008 Dominik took over Talk 107 Drive with Marisa de Andrade. In April 2008, following a station revamp, the show became known as Diamond and de Andrade''. Diamond left Talk 107; the station closed in December 2008.

He hosted The Dominik Diamond Show Mon–Fri 6–11pm on Q107 in Toronto. After a stint hosting on new music station Radio 96.5 in Halifax, Nova Scotia, Diamond returned to the Toronto market in March 2014, replacing Dean Blundell as host of the morning show on 102.1 The Edge. From September 2015 to November 2018 he was the Morning Show host on 96.9 Jack FM in Calgary. In April 2020 during the COVID-19 lockdown, Dominik started a live-stream channel on Twitch.

References

External links
 

1969 births
Living people
Alumni of the University of Bristol
British radio DJs
Scottish emigrants to Canada
Scottish television presenters
Scottish radio presenters
People from Arbroath
People educated at Strathallan School
Canadian radio hosts